Emilio Botín-Sanz de Sautuola García de los Ríos, iure uxoris Marquess of O'Shea (1 October 1934 – 10 September 2014) was a Spanish banker. He was the executive chairman of Spain's Grupo Santander. In 1993 his bank absorbed Banco Español de Crédito (Banesto), and in 1999 it merged with Banco Central Hispano creating Banco Santander Central Hispano (BSCH), which became Spain's largest bank, of which he was co-president with Central Hispano's José María Amusategui, until Amusategui retired in 2002. In 2004, BSCH acquired the British bank Abbey National, making BSCH the second largest bank in Europe by market capitalisation. He was known for his obsession with growth and performance as well as regularly visiting branches.

Early life
Botín was born in Santander, Cantabria, on the northern coast of Spain, the eldest of two sons of Emilio Botín-Sanz de Sautuola López , born on 18 January 1903, and Ana María García de los Ríos y Caller. After attending as a boarding student the Jesuit school of Colegio de la Inmaculada, in Gijón, he studied law and economics at the University of Deusto in Bilbao.

Career
In 1986 Botín, then aged 52, took over from his father as chairman of Santander, one of many banks that existed in Spain at the time. Botín was no newcomer to the banking world. His father, grandfather and great-grandfather were all bankers.

In 2005, Forbes put Emilio Botín's net worth at $1.7 billion. Botín's eldest daughter, Ana Patricia Botín, was the president of Banesto from 2002 to November 2010 and was the CEO of Santander UK from December 2010 until Emilio's death upon which she was elected his successor as executive chairman of Grupo Santander.

During his chairmanship, Banco Santander was named 2012 'Best bank in the world', the third time that the bank had received this award over the previous seven years.

Secret bank accounts
Botín and his family held undisclosed bank accounts in Switzerland since 1937. Those accounts were discovered by the Spanish tax authorities in 2010. Botín and his family voluntarily settled the case, paying a bill of €200 million. In 2012, Spain's High Court dropped a tax evasion probe for these issues, stating that Botín and his family had satisfied Spanish tax authorities with the €200 million settlement.

Personal life
Botín was married to the Marchioness of O'Shea, and they had six children. His daughter Carmen was married to golfer Seve Ballesteros from 1988 to 2004.

He died on 9 September 2014, of a heart attack in Madrid. Botín was survived by his six children and nineteen grandchildren.

Botin's eldest daughter Ana Patricia Botín, previously head of Santander's British business, was appointed chairman after his death.

Notes

References

External links

Profile of Emilio Botín
A survey considers Emilio Botín as the best Spanish valued CEO
 Was Emilio Botín murdered?
Emilio Botín repeats as most influential businessman in Spain
Emilio Botín, the most influential Spanish businessman according to research: KAR 2011, Ipsos Public Affairs. 
The Banker nombra al Santander 'banco del año' en Reino Unido, México, Polonia, Portugal, Argentina y Puerto Rico". expansion.com. November 2012.
New York Times Article_Tax Fraud Investigation on Botín
How Botin's secret account was discovered. Online Article in Cuarto Poder (In Spanish)

1934 births
2014 deaths
People from Santander, Spain
Businesspeople from Cantabria
Spanish billionaires
Spanish chairpersons of corporations
University of Deusto alumni
Spanish bankers
Members of the Board of Directors of the Banco Santander
Colegio de la Inmaculada (Gijón) alumni